In Celtic mythology, Taranis (Proto-Celtic: *Toranos, earlier *Tonaros; Latin: Taranus, earlier Tanarus) is the god of thunder, who was worshipped primarily in Gaul, Hispania, Britain, and Ireland, but also in the Rhineland and Danube regions, amongst others. Taranis, along with Esus and Toutatis, was mentioned by the Roman poet Lucan in his epic poem Pharsalia as a Celtic deity to whom human sacrificial offerings were made. Taranis was associated, as was the Cyclops Brontes ("thunder") in Greek mythology, with the wheel.

Many representations of a bearded god with a thunderbolt in one hand and a wheel in the other have been recovered from Gaul, where this deity apparently came to be syncretised with Jupiter.

Name and etymology 
The Proto-Celtic form of the name is reconstructed as *Toranos ('Thunder'), which derives through metathesis (switch of sounds) from an earlier *Tonaros, itself from the Proto-Indo-European (PIE) stem for 'thunder', *(s)tenh₂-. The original, unmetathesized form of the name is attested in the dative form tanaro (Chester, 154 AD), found on a votive altar dedicated by a Roman officer from Clunia (modern Burgos Province), and in the Gaulish hydronym Tanarus ('thundering' or 'thunderous'), an ancient name of the River Po (northern Italy). Similar European hydronyms have also been proposed to belong to the same root. The PIE s-initial seems to have been retained in Celtiberian steniontes, stenion, and stena. 

In the Indo-European context, the Proto-Celtic name *Tonaros is identical to the Proto-Germanic Thunder-god *Þun(a)raz (cf. ON Þórr, OE Þunor, OS Thunar, OFris. Thuner, OHG Donar), and further related to the Sanskrit stánati and Latin tono, both meaning 'to thunder'. According to scholar Peter Jackson, the Celtic–Germanic isogloss *Þun(a)raz ~ *Tonaros may have emerged as the result of the fossilization of an original epithet (or epiclesis) of the Proto-Indo-European thunder-god *Perkwunos. 

The later form *Toranos is attested in the Gaulish divine names Taranis and Taranucnos, as well as in the personal name Taranutius. The name Taran, which appears in the prehistoric section of the Pictish King-List, may also be interpreted as a euhemerized god. The Hispano-Celtic tar(a)nekūm could mean 'of the descendants of Tar(a)nos'.

Additional cognates may also be found in medieval Celtic languages, such as Old Irish torann ('thunder, noise'), Old Breton taran, Old Cornish taran, and Middle Welsh taran ('[peal of] thunder, thunderclap'). The Gaulish word for 'thunder' has been preserved in Gascon taram.

Association with the wheel

The wheel, more specifically the chariot wheel with six or eight spokes, was an important symbol in historical Celtic polytheism, apparently associated with a specific god, known as the wheel-god, identified as the sky- sun- or thunder-god, whose name is attested as Taranis by Lucan. Numerous Celtic coins also depict such a wheel. The half-wheel shown in the Gundestrup cauldron "broken wheel" panel also has eight visible spokes.

Symbolic votive wheels were offered at shrines (such as in Alesia), cast in rivers (such as the Seine), buried in tombs or worn as amulets since the Middle Bronze Age. Such "wheel pendants" from the Bronze Age usually had four spokes, and are commonly identified as solar symbols or "sun crosses". Artefacts parallel to the Celtic votive wheels or wheel-pendants are the so-called Zierscheiben in a Germanic context. The identification of the Sun with a wheel, or a chariot, has parallels in Germanic, Greek and Vedic mythology (see sun chariot).

Later cultural references
In 2013 a British combat drone system developed by defence contractor BAE Systems was named Taranis in reference to the Celtic god.

Taranis and Toutatis are often mentioned by characters of the Asterix series.

Taranis and other Celtic gods are often referred to in the EPIX television series Britannia

MacG Racing have developed a racing car called the Taranis racing in the British Endurance Championship.

See also
Delbáeth
Fontes Tamarici
Perkūnas
Indra
Perun
Thor
Tuireann
Zeus

Footnotes

References 

 Ellis, Peter Berresford, Dictionary of Celtic Mythology (Oxford Paperback Reference), Oxford University Press, (1994): 

 MacKillop, James. Dictionary of Celtic Mythology. Oxford: Oxford University Press, 1998. .

 Wood, Juliette, The Celts: Life, Myth, and Art, Thorsons Publishers (2002):

Further reading
 Gricourt, Daniel; Hollard, Dominique. "Taranis, caelestiorum deorum maximus". In: Dialogues d'histoire ancienne, vol. 17, n°1, 1991. pp. 343–400. [DOI: https://doi.org/10.3406/dha.1991.1919]; [www.persee.fr/doc/dha_0755-7256_1991_num_17_1_1919]
 Gricourt, Daniel; Hollard, Dominique. "Taranis, le dieu celtique à la roue. Remarques préliminaires". In: Dialogues d'histoire ancienne, vol. 16, n°2, 1990. pp. 275–320. [DOI: https://doi.org/10.3406/dha.1990.1491]; www.persee.fr/doc/dha_0755-7256_1990_num_16_2_1491

External links

Celtic Gods and Associates
Images of Taranis
Celtic Gods

Gaulish gods
Gods of the ancient Britons
Thunder gods
Jovian deities